Code of the Outlaw is a 1942 American Western "Three Mesquiteers" B-movie directed by John English.

Cast 
 Bob Steele as Tucson Smith
 Tom Tyler as Stony Brooke
 Rufe Davis as Lullaby Joslin
 Weldon Heyburn as Bart 'Pop' Hardin
 Benny Bartlett as Tim Hardin (as Bennie Bartlett)
 Linda Leighton as Sue Dayton (as Melinda Leighton)
 Donald Curtis as Henchman Taggart
 John Ince as Sheriff Ed Stoddard
 Kenne Duncan as Henchman Plug (as Ken Duncan)
 Phil Dunham as Boyle
 Max Waizmann as Dr. Horace M. Beagle (as Max Waizman)
 Chuck Morrison as Wounded Henchman
 Carleton Young as Henchman

References

External links 

1942 films
1942 Western (genre) films
American Western (genre) films
American black-and-white films
Films directed by John English
Republic Pictures films
Three Mesquiteers films
1940s English-language films
1940s American films